Erin's Own GAA is a Gaelic Athletic Association club located in Glounthaune in east County Cork, Ireland.  The club is made up of players from Little Island, Knockraha, Brooklodge and Glounthaune areas of the parish.  The club caters for players at all age levels in hurling, Gaelic football, camogie and ladies football. The club plays in the Imokilly division of Cork GAA.

History

Erin's Own GAA Club was founded in 1963 with the amalgamation of the two parish clubs, Knockraha and Little Island. The decision to form the new club was based on a desire to strengthen Gaelic games in the parish of Glounthaune by forming one strong unit where two weaker ones previously existed. The games had been played in the Parish for well over a hundred years.

Hurling

Honours
Munster Senior Club Hurling Championship: 0
 (Runners-Up 2006)
Cork Senior Hurling Championship: 3
 1992, 2006, 2007 (Runners-Up 2000, 2016)
Cork Intermediate Hurling Championship: 2
 1984, 1987 (Runners-Up 1982, 1986)
Cork Junior Hurling Championship: 1
 2022 (Runners-Up 1977)
Cork Under-21 Hurling Championship: 4
 2002, 2004, 2005 (Runners-Up 1999)
Cork Under-21 A Hurling Championship: 1
 2016
Cork Minor Hurling Championship: 3
 1999, 2000, 2001 (Runners-Up 1908) (as Little Island)
Cork Minor A Hurling Championship: 1
 1998 (Runners-Up 2008)
East Cork Junior A Hurling Championship: 6
 1973, 1975, 1977, 1979, 2007, 2022

Gaelic football

Honours

Cork Junior Football Championship: 2
 1994, 2005
 Munster Junior Club Football Championship Runners-up 2005
Cork Under-21 Football Championship: 0
Runners-Up 2002, 2003
Cork Under-21 B Football Championship 1
 2010
East Cork Junior A Football Championship: 5
 1994, 2002, 2003, 2005, 2017 | R/U: 1990, 1993, 1999, 2001, 2004

Notable players
 Brian Corcoran
 Eoghan Murphy
 Kilian Murphy
 Kieran Murphy
 Shane Murphy
 James O'Flynn
 Robbie O'Flynn
 Timmy Kelleher
 Cian O'Connor

External links
Cork GAA site
Erins Own GAA site

Gaelic games clubs in County Cork
Hurling clubs in County Cork
Gaelic football clubs in County Cork